The Exchange Building is a historic 10-story residential building located in Downtown San Antonio in the U.S. state of Texas. 

It was listed on the National Register of Historic Places in 1994. In the early 1990s it was renovated into apartments by Lake/Flato Architects.

Originally built for the San Antonio Builder's Exchange, the Exchange Building was later occupied by the American Hospital and Life Insurance Company.

References

Residential skyscrapers in San Antonio
National Register of Historic Places in Bexar County, Texas